The 2001–02 season was the 89th season in the history of Racing de Santander and the club's first season back in the second division of Spanish football since 1993. In addition to the domestic league, Racing Santander participated in this season's edition of the Copa del Rey.

Players

First-team squad

Competitions

Overall record

Segunda División

League table

Results summary

Results by round

Matches

Copa del Rey

References

Racing de Santander seasons
Racing Santander